The Milk Carton Kids are an American indie folk duo from Eagle Rock, California, United States, consisting of singers and guitarists Kenneth Pattengale and Joey Ryan, who began making music together in early 2011. The band has recorded and released  six albums: Retrospect, Prologue,  The Ash & Clay, Monterey, All the Things That I Did and All the Things That I Didn't Do, and The Only Ones. They are noted for releasing their first two albums free of charge. The band was featured on the Peacock TV show Girls5Eva with the new song New York Lonely Boy.

Biography
Joey Ryan and Kenneth Pattengale formed a musical duo after Ryan attended a solo performance by Pattengale in their shared hometown of Eagle Rock, California. The Milk Carton Kids came together after both artists had largely unsuccessful solo careers and had reached a professional crossroads.

They released Retrospect, a live album recorded at Zoey's  Cafe in Ventura, California in March 2011. Retrospect predates the band name, and was released under Kenneth Pattengale & Joey Ryan. After performing at SXSW in March 2011, The Milk Carton Kids joined Joe Purdy's North American tour as his opening act and backing band.

Prologue (2011)
The duo released Prologue on July 19, 2011. This was their first studio album and the first release under the band's name. The San Francisco Chronicle referred to Prologue as "bittersweet and beautiful."

"There By Your Side" was named National Public Radio's Song of the Day. Prologue made Daytrotter, American Songwriter, and About.com year-end lists.

Following Prologue’s release, the group headlined a North American tour.

The Ash & Clay (2013)
The group's second album The Ash & Clay was released on ANTI- records on March 26, 2013. Promotion for the album included touring with Austin-based artist, Sarah Jarosz, and a November taping of Austin City Limits.

Monterey (2015)
On May 19, 2015, the band released its album, Monterey, on ANTI- records. The album was well-reviewed, with Rolling Stone calling it a "beautifully realised folk recording," and Paste calling the album, "exquisite."

All the Things That I Did and All the Things That I Didn't Do (2018)
All the Things That I Did and All the Things That I Didn't Do was released on June 29, 2018, on Anti- Records. Rolling Stone praised the album, with writer Luke Levenson noting the bandmates' life changes as significant influences in its sound, commenting, "both halves of the troubadour twosome have undergone serious life changes, with Joey Ryan fathering his second child, and Kenneth Pattengale overcoming cancer and the breakup of a seven-year relationship."

The Only Ones (2019)
The Only Ones was released on October 18, 2019,  and was marketed and distributed by Thirty Tigers. It had a relatively short length for a studio album, at just 25 minutes and 33 seconds. This led the band to quip at live performances that they intended to release an EP but added two extra songs.

Appearances and performances
The Milk Carton Kids have performed on National Public Radio's Mountain Stage, Daytrotter, and were guest DJ hosts on Sirius/XM's folk channel The Village. The duo toured on July/August 2012 with Old Crow Medicine Show who were supporting their new albums "Carry Me Back") and The Lumineers. The tour visited such cities as: Louisville, Cincinnati, Nashville, Richmond, Washington, D.C., Philadelphia, New York City, Boston, and Atlanta. In the fall of 2012, they toured America again with L.A.-based Leslie Stevens opening and in November 2012, they began their tour with the Punch Brothers. In December 2012, three unreleased tracks ("Snake Eyes", "The Ash & Clay" and "Jewel of June") were featured in Gus Van Sant's film Promised Land, starring Matt Damon and John Krasinski.

They were also featured in T Bone Burnett & The Coen Brothers' concert film documentary, Another Day/Another Time: Celebrating the Music of Inside Llewyn Davis, alongside Joan Baez, Jack White, Gillian Welch, Marcus Mumford, Punch Brothers and many other folk luminaries and upstarts.

After the 2013 release of The Ash & Clay they appeared on a number of TV and Radio performances including Garrison Keillor's A Prairie Home Companion, CBS This Morning, and Conan.

On April 29, 2014 National Public Radio released a full concert DVD, Live at Lincoln Theatre. On April 11–12, 2014 they collaborated with Joe Henry and Over the Rhine for a two night live performance & recording of all new songs inspired by the Great American Songbook. An album of the collaboration may be forthcoming but no date has been set at this time.

In October 2016, the duo joined the Lampedusa concert tour in the US in support of equal human rights for refugees.

Instruments 
Ryan plays a 1951 Gibson J-45 acoustic guitar while Pattengale performs on a 1954 Martin 0-15.

Awards, honors, distinctions
The Milk Carton Kids' 2013 album, The Ash & Clay, received a Grammy Award nomination for Best Folk Album of 2013, and the duo additionally received a nomination for Best Emerging Artist of the Year at the 2013 Americana Music Honors & Awards.

In 2014 they were selected the Americana Music Association Duo/Group of the Year.

The song "City of Our Lady" from the 2015 album Monterey received a Grammy Award nomination for Best American Roots Performance.

Both Prologue and Retrospect were made available for free download at the group's website. By the end of 2011, the two albums had been downloaded for free over 60,000 times. By February 2014 downloads had reached 275,000.

Discography
Retrospect (2011) 
 "Permanent" (5:10)
 "Laredo" (5:57)
 "Broken Headlights" (3:20)
 "Charlie" (4:01)
 "Maybe It's Time" (4:27)
 "Trouble in These Parts" (4:22)
 "Girls, Gather 'Round" (4:54)
 "As It Must Be" (4:38)
 "Memoirs of an Owned Dog" (4:08)
 "Queen Jane" (3:56)
 "Rock & Roll 'Er" (5:04)
 "Lake Skaneateles" (3:54)
 "California" (4:43)
 "Like A Cloak" (5:14)
''Prologue (2011) 
 "Michigan" (5:31)
 "Undress the World" (3:17)
 "Milk Carton Kid" (4:05)
 "One Goodbye" (3:13)
 "No Hammer to Hold" (3:13)
 "There By Your Side" (4:05)
 "New York" (3:33)
 "Stealing Romance" (2:50)
 "I Still Want a Little More" (3:12)The Ash & Clay (2013) "Hope of a Lifetime"
 "Snake Eyes"
 "Honey, Honey"
 "Years Gone By"
 "The Ash & Clay"
 "Promised Land"
 "The Jewel of June"
 "Whisper in Her Ear"
 "On the Mend"
 "Heaven"
 "Hear Them Loud"
 "Memphis"NPR's Live From Lincoln Theatre (2014)Monterey (2015) "Asheville Skies"
 "Getaway"
 "Monterey"
 "Secrets of the Stars"
 "Freedom"
 "High Hopes"
 "Deadly Bells"
 "Shooting Shadows"
 "The City of Our Lady"
 "Sing, Sparrow, Sing"
 "Poison Tree"Wish You Were Here - Single (2015) "Wish You Were Here"All the Things That I Did and All the Things That I Didn't Do'' (2018)
 "Just Look at Us Now"
 "Nothing Is Real"
 "Younger Years"
 "Mourning in America"
 "You Break My Heart"
 "Blindness"
 "One More for the Road"
 "Big Time"
 "A Sea of Roses"
 "Unwinnable War"
 "I've Been Loving You"
 "All the Things..."
The Only Ones (2019)
"I Meant Every Word I Said"
"I'll be Gone"
"The Only Ones"
"My Name is Ana"
"As the Moon Starts to Rise"
"About the Size of a Pixel"
"I Was Alive"

References

External links

Official website
WaveCat Playlist

American musical duos
Musical groups from Los Angeles
Musical groups established in 2011
American folk musical groups
2011 establishments in California
Anti- (record label) artists